Salixto Medina Malave is a Puerto Rican lawyer. He was the assistant United States Attorney for Puerto Rico.

He was involved in a number of important cases.

See also

List of Puerto Ricans

References

Year of birth missing (living people)
Puerto Rican lawyers
Living people